Rhamphocoris is an Asian and Australian genus of bugs in the family Nabidae, subfamily Prostemmatinae and tribe Phorticini.

Species
Known species include:
 Rhamphocoris borneensis (Schumacher, 1914)
 Rhamphocoris dorothea  Kirkaldy, 1901 - type species
 Rhamphocoris elegantulus (Schumacher, 1914)
 Rhamphocoris guizhouensis Zhao, Mao & Cao, 2019
 Rhamphocoris hasegawai (Ishihara, 1943)
 Rhamphocoris humeralis
 Rhamphocoris linnavuorii Cassis, 2016
 Rhamphocoris monteithi Cassis, 2016
 Rhamphocoris poppiusi
 Rhamphocoris pulcher (Reuter & Poppius, 1909)
 Rhamphocoris reuteri
 Rhamphocoris rubroniger Kerzhner, 1990
 Rhamphocoris sejunctus Cassis, 2016
 Rhamphocoris tenebrosus Cassis, 2016
 Rhamphocoris tibialis Hsiao, 1981

Note
This genus may be confused with the monotypic bird genus Ramphocoris containing Ramphocoris clotbey.

References

External links
 

Heteroptera genera
Nabidae